Thelymitra queenslandica, commonly called the northern sun orchid, is a species of orchid that is endemic to Queensland. It has a single long, grass-like leaf and up to fifteen dark blue to purplish, sometimes white or pinkish flowers with white or pink tufts on top of the anther. It is readily distinguished by its northerly distribution and early flowering period.

Description
The lobe on the top of the anther is tan-coloured to brown with a yellow tip. The side lobes curve upwards and have mop-like tufts of white or pink hairs. The flowers are long-lasting, insect-pollinated and open on warm sunny days. Flowering occurs from June to September.

Taxonomy and naming
Thelymitra queenslandica was first formally described in 2013 by Jeff Jeanes from a specimen collected near Herberton by David Jones and the description was published in Muelleria. The specific epithet (queenslandica) refers to "the state of Queensland where this species is apparently endemic."

Distribution and habitat
The northern sun orchid mainly grows on forested slopes and occurs between Paluma and Mount Finnigan.

References

queenslandica
Endemic orchids of Australia
Orchids of Queensland
Plants described in 2013